Robert "Bob" Jones (1921 – death unknown) was a Welsh rugby union, and professional rugby league footballer who played in the 1940s.

International honours
Jones represented Wales XV (RU) while at Aberavon RFC in the 'Victory International' non-Test matches between December 1945 and April 1946, and won 3 caps for Wales (RL) in 1947–1949 while at Swinton and St. Helens.

Note
Jones's forename is stated as Robert by rugbyleagueproject.org, but as Dicky by saints.org.uk.

References

External links
Profile at saints.org.uk
Search for "Jones" at espnscrum.com

1921 births
Year of death missing
Aberavon RFC players
Footballers who switched code
Glamorgan County RFC players
Hunslet F.C. (1883) players
Place of birth missing
Rugby league props
Rugby league second-rows
Rugby union forwards
St Helens R.F.C. players
Swinton Lions players
Wales international rugby union players
Wales national rugby league team players
Welsh rugby league players
Welsh rugby union players